The 1994 All-Ireland Senior Camogie Championship Final was the 63rd All-Ireland Final and the deciding match of the 1994 All-Ireland Senior Camogie Championship, an inter-county camogie tournament for the top teams in Ireland.

Kilkenny won a twelfth All-Ireland title, captain Angela Downey scoring 2-3.

References

All-Ireland Senior Camogie Championship Finals
All-Ireland Senior Camogie Championship Final
All-Ireland Senior Camogie Championship Final
All-Ireland Senior Camogie Championship Final, 1994